This page provides supplementary chemical data on ethyl acetate.

Material Safety Data Sheet  

The handling of this chemical may incur notable safety precautions. It is highly recommended that you seek the Material Safety Datasheet (MSDS) for this chemical from a reliable source and follow its directions.
Science Stuff
 Baker
 Fisher
 Eastman

Structure and properties

Thermodynamic properties

Distillation data

Spectral data

References

SDBS spectral database

Chemical data pages
Chemical data pages cleanup